Lina Dorado (born April 2, 1975) is a contemporary artist and filmmaker based in New York City noted for her multimedia work and travel photography, Lina Dorado has authored two books in bilingual editions: Doble Vista / Second Sight (Arte Dos Gráfico-Editores) and Drawing Only, Solo Dibujo (Villegas Editores) alongside her long-term collaborator: Luis Cantillo. Their book Doble Vista / Second Sight written by Dorado and photographs by both was acquired by the New York Public Library Museum of Modern Art in New York MOMA and the Whitney Museum for their Artists' Books Collection.
In August 2018 her first feature film Pelucas y Rokanrol was theatrically released in Colombia, the film was directed by Mario Duarte and written by Mario Duarte and Lina Dorado .

Early life and education

Born in Bogotá she attended a screenwriting seminar at 16 years old with the writer and producer Juana Uribe and landed a job writing for television as part of the creative writing team behind the TV series "De Pies a Cabeza", that went on to write many T.V hits including Colombia's Betty la Fea ( Now the American comedy-drama television series Ugly Betty).

Dorado entered the B.A program in Fine Arts at the Universidad Nacional de Colombia, where she was awarded for three consecutive terms the academic recognition matricula de honor (gaining top marks in her class with the right to free registration the following year).
Dorado then moved to London earning a BA(Hons.) degree in Fine Arts specialized in Film and Video at Central Saint Martins College of Art and Design.

With a First Class Honours degree from Central Saint Martins, Dorado applied to the graduate film program at Columbia University in New York City. She graduated from Columbia University in 2006 earning an MFA in film directing.

Filmmaking

After publishing two books and widely exhibiting her art work, she concentrated on her film work for which she is best known: She directed 2 AM, Two Around The Mountain (2005), premiered in New York at the Brooklyn Museum her first feature documentary: Dalai Lama, Colombia. Backstage previewed in New York city at the Maysles Institute in March of 09 and in the Tibet Center in DUMBO. Dorado has acted as a story editing advisor for films such as: Gogol Bordello Non-Stop (2008), Directed by Margarita Jimeno, and Abraham-Obama (2009) Directed by Kevin Chapados.In April 2009 Dorado traveled to India where she shot and directed a series of shorts about Tibetan Communities in exile, documenting the program of the Namgyal Monastery "The Heart of Tibet in Exile", organized by the Monastery of the 14th Dalai Lama.

As a music video film director she collaborated with musician and actor Mario Duarte Mario Duarte and his rock band La Derecha La Derecha, she wrote and directed a video titled The Specialist and the Eye". for their song "El Puñal". 
As of November 2012, the video had surpassed the one million views on YouTube. and the song was nominated as best rock alternative song of the year 2012 by the Colombian music magazine Shock

In August 2018 her first feature film Pelucas y Rokanrol had a theatrical release in cinemas in diverse cities of Colombia, the film was directed by Mario Duarte and written by Mario Duarte and Lina Dorado .

Short films
In 2012, Dorado directed a short documentary video about the Abbot Investiture of Tibetan Buddhist monk and photographer [Nicholas Vreeland]] commissioned by the Tibet Center This is a small document of an event of historic importance since Vreeland is the first Westerner appointed abbot of a Tibetan Buddhist monastery

Personal life

Born in Bogotá, Colombia, she is the daughter of actor and screenwriter Humberto Dorado and painter Maria Moran.
She worked alongside contemporary artist Luis Cantillo for over ten years they claim to "continue to comment and participate in each others endeavors" but each of them currently pursues their own individual work while admitting that their career "continues to be informed and influenced by their extraordinary artistic collaboration". Dorado lives in New York city with her long-term partner, whom she married in 2011.

Selection of Exhibitions and Projects

 2005 – Viper Video and New Media Festival, Basel, Switzerland
 2005 – Brooklyn International Film Festival, Brooklyn Museum, Brooklyn, USA
 2005 – Independents Film Festival, Tampa, Florida, USA
 2005 – 2 AM (Dos Alrededor de la Montaña), Alliance Française, Bogotá, Colombia (solo)
 2004 – Doble Vista, Galería Diners, Bogotá, Colombia (solo)
 2004 – Field of depth, Latin Collector, New York
 2004 – Urbes Interiores, Luis Angel Arango, Bogotá, Colombia
 2004 – A deux, Web Project, Forum de l’Image, Toulouse, Francia
 2004 – Errancias, Centro Cultural Comfandi, Cali, Colombia
 2003 – Afuera, Museo de Arte Universidad Nacional, Bogotá, Colombia (solo)
 2003 – Errancias, Valenzuela y Klenner Arte Contemporaneo, Bogotá, Colombia
 2003 – Still Life / Naturaleza Muerta, Biblioteca Luis Angel Arango, Bogotá, Colombia
 2003 – V Bienal de Venecia Bogotá, Centro Comunal Venecia, Bogotá, Colombia
 2003 – Solo Dibujo, Museo de Arte Universidad Nacional, Bogotá, Colombia
 2003 – 16 FilmWinter, Stuttgart, Alemania
 2002 – Airborne, Midlanda KonstHall, Timra, Suecia
 2002 – File 2002, Instituição Cultural Paço das Artes, São Paulo, Brazil
 2002 – EntreCasa, Galeria SantaFe, Bogotá, Colombia
 2002 – Portatil, Museo de Arte Universidad Nacional, Bogotá, Colombia
 2001 – What we did on our holidays, Hastings Museum of Art, Inglaterra
 2001 – Travellers’ Tales InIVA, Londres, Inglaterra
 2001 – Mobil Art, Gallery Rocket, Harajuku, Tokyo, Japan
 2000 – A.U.R.E.L.S. Galerie d'Aurel, Francia
 2000 – Transito, Museo de Arte Universidad Nacional, Bogotá, Colombia
 2000 – Wigs, Diamonds and a Frozen Turkey, W.i.s.h. Gallery, Londres, Inglaterra
 1999 – X-hibit 99, London Institute Gallery, Londres, Inglaterra
 1999 – Barclays Drawing Award, Northampton, Inglaterra
 1999 – Walk, Lambeth Walk, Londres, Inglaterra
 1999 – Dislocation, Notting Hill Arts Club, Londres, Inglaterra
 1998 – Emergencia, Museo de Arte de La Universidad Nacional, Bogotá, Colombia
 1997 – 2nd Portobello Film & Video Festival, Londres, Inglaterra

Books
2004
  
Doble Vista/Second Sight, Written by Lina Dorado. Photos by Lina Dorado and Luis Cantillo.Publisher: Arte Dos Grafico, Bogotá, Colombia

2001
  
Sólo Dibujo, Author. Original Concept :Lina Dorado curated by Luis Cantillo, Villegas Editores, Bogotá, Colombia

Awards
Best Director Award, Columbia University (New York, 2004)

First Prize Fine Arts Short Film, New Screen TV (USA, 2006)

II Bienal Inter-Americana de Video (Washington D.C., 2004)

File Festival (Brazil, 2004).The Queen Elizabeth Scholarship, England.

Poporo Animation Story by Lina Dorado 1st Award, Inter-American Biennial of Video Art, Washington DC, USA 2004

 
2nd Award, Salón de Fotografía ´El Municipal´, Bogotá, Colombia 2002

Mención de honor, Barclays Drawing Award, Northampton, Inglaterra 1999

 
1st Award, XXIII Salón Francisco Antonio Cano, Bogotá, Colombia 1996

Bibliography

El Tiempo Newspaper, Bogota, Colombia January 17, 2005

Semana Libros No.2, Cuando el libro es un objeto de arte, Luis A. Parra, Nov 4

NY Art Magazine, Carlos Motta, Summer 2004

Revista Cromos, 'Los que vuelven', Dominique Rodriguez, June-04

ArtNexus Magazine No.53, Review of "Still Life", Marta Rodríguez, Summer 2004

El Tiempo, Los recorridos de dos artistas nómadas, Paola Villamarín, 16-03-04

Revista Diners, 'Arte a duo' Margarita Garcia, March 2004

Revista Cromos, Dominique Rodriguez, 12-03-04

El Tiempo, Lecturas Dominicales, Trabajo Fotográfico de Dorado-Cantillo, Graham Ellard, 14-03-04

ArtNexus Magazine No.49, Review of "Solo Dibujo", Marta Rodríguez, Summer 2003

Arte en Colombia, Review of "Solo Dibujo", Marta Rodríguez, Summer 2003

Periodico UN, Miguel Huertas, Sólo Dibujo, April 20, 2003, p. 24.

Revista Cambio, Más allá del dibujo, Nelly Peñaranda, April 2003

Zona de Distención, Primer salón abierto de Fotografía, Carlos Sanabria, January 2003

A6, Revista Asterisco, 'Dibujo:Aforismo pretencioso, Jose Roca, 2002

Le Monde, Jeunes artistes en liberté à la Galerie d'Aurel, Jacques Bugier, August 25, 2000

Collections

Biblioteca Luis Angel Arango, Bogotá, Colombia
Museo de Arte Universidad Nacional, Bogotá, Colombia
Museum of Modern Art (Colección libros de artista), Nueva York, EU
Whitney Museum of American Art (Colección libros de artista), Nueva York, EU

References

External links
 
 http://www.telegrama.org] at Lina Dorado + Luis Cantillo official site
 http://www.independentexposure.com/filmmaker/1821/LinaDorado.html
 http://www.villegaseditores.com/libro.html?isbn=9588160073&bzq=activos
 http://www.mcarts.com/souvenir/cantillo.html
 http://www.tibetfilmarchive.org/

1975 births
Living people
American women photographers
Feminist artists
Columbia University School of the Arts alumni
American contemporary artists
American women writers
American photographers
Alumni of Central Saint Martins
21st-century American women